Pedro Rubén Brieger (born 5 November 1955, Buenos Aires, Argentina) is an Argentine journalist and sociologist. He is a professor of Middle East Sociology at the University of Buenos Aires Faculty of Social Sciences. He worked for different newspapers, including Clarín, El Cronista, La Nación, Página/12, Perfil and Miami Herald; and magazines like Noticias, Tres Puntos, Revista Veintitrés and Le Monde diplomatique.

In August 2006 he reported that Canal Siete, the channel where his program was being broadcast, had received pressure from the Israeli ambassador Rafael Eldad, because of its coverage of the military conflict in Middle East. Although the diplomat denied these statements, the Union Press Workers of Buenos Aires issued a statement where they expressed solidarity with Brieger, considering "unacceptable the expressions of the Ambassador Eldad".

In August 2009 he received the Martín Fierro Award as the best male journalistic labour on TV, during 2008. In May 2010 he received again the same prize.

Books
Whither Nicaragua? (1989)
The last days of the USSR - Boris Yeltsin vs. Gorbachev (1991)
Middle East and the Gulf War (1991)
Holy War or Political Struggle? Interviews and discussion on Islam (1996)
War and globalization after September 11" In Global World "Global War? The dilemmas of globalization. (2002)
The lost decade to decade of neoliberal myth. In The Economic and financial globalization. Its impact on Latin America. (2002)
The assemblies of neighbors, a new experience in politics. In Argentina, issues and roots of a society in crisis" (Paris 2003)
What's Al Qaeda? (2006)
One hundred questions and answers about the Israeli-Palestinian conflict (2010)
What's Al Qaeda? (2010)

Awards

Nominations
 2013 Martín Fierro Awards
 Best male journalist

References

External links
 Official site of Pedro Brieger
 Blog of Pedro Brieger

1955 births
Living people
Writers from Buenos Aires
Argentine people of German-Jewish descent
Argentine Jews
Argentine sociologists
Jewish sociologists
Argentine journalists
Male journalists
Jewish Argentine writers
Anti-Zionist Jews